Bernard Bouley (born 11 July 1950) is a French politician who became Member of Parliament for Essonne's 2nd constituency in 2020, when he replaced Franck Marlin. He stood down at the 2022 French legislative election.

References 

Living people
1950 births
21st-century French politicians
The Republicans (France) politicians
Deputies of the 15th National Assembly of the French Fifth Republic
Politicians from Paris